Aghavrin Clapper Bridge straddles the townlands of Aghavrin and Shanavagha, at the eastern end of Mullinhassig Wood & Waterfalls, and is located  west of Coachford village in County Cork, Ireland.

Clapper bridges are composed of a series of stone piers or blocks, which support slabs, so as to form bridges. The word 'clapper' is derived from the Latin claperium, a 'pile of stones'.

This bridge is depicted on both the 1841 and 1901 surveyed OS maps, and appears to have been in use for many years, as a crossing point over the River Glashagarriff (Glaise Gharbh in the Irish language meaning 'rough rivulet').

It collapsed in recent times due to flood damage.

See also
Aghavrin (townland)
Aghavrin House
Aghavrin Cottage
Aghavrin Mass Rock
Crooke's Castle, Aghavrin
St Olan's, Aghavrin
Mullinhassig Wood & Waterfalls, Aghavrin

References

External links
 1841 surveyed OS map (maps.osi.ie)
 1901 surveyed OS map (maps.osi.ie)
 acrheritage.info

Pedestrian bridges in the Republic of Ireland
Stone bridges
Bridges in County Cork